Ethniki Amyna is an Athens Metro Line 3 (Blue Line) station with an island platform, situated close to the Ministry of National Defence and the Ministry of Transportation and Communications. When the Metro first opened, it served as the terminal station for all trains to that direction (Syntagma station being the other end of the line at the time).

Station layout

Cultural works
Ethniki Amyna has four art installations: three sculptures at the platform level and one large installation in the concourse.
 Dimitris Kalamaras: The dead fighter (platform level)
 Clearhos Loukopoulos: Stele (platform level)
 Costas Koulentianos: Nouvelle Generation IX (platform level)
 Costas Tsoklis, Underground Park (concourse)

References

Athens Metro stations
Railway stations opened in 2000
2000 establishments in Greece